The 2002 Women's World Amateur Boxing Championships was an international women's boxing competition hosted by Turkey from October 21 to 27 2002 in Antalya. It was the 2nd championship, which debuted 2001 in Scranton, Pennsylvania, United States.

Results
Bronze medals are awarded to both losing semi-finalists.

Medal count table

References

World 2002
Women's World Boxing Championships
Boxing
Sport in Antalya
21st century in Antalya
2002 in women's boxing
October 2002 sports events in Turkey